Jacqui Stewart (née Apiata, born 10 June 1966) is a former New Zealand rugby union player. She played for New Zealand at the inaugural 1991 Women's Rugby World Cup.

Career 
Apiata grew up in Otautau where she attended Otautau School and Central Southland College. She took up rugby while studying at the University of Canterbury. She played Centre in the Black Ferns first-ever match in 1989 against the California Grizzlies in Christchurch. She later played in the first home and away tests against Australia in 1994 and 1995.

In 2018, Apiata was among several former Black Ferns who received test caps, she was given the first cap.

References

External links 

 Black Ferns Profile

1966 births
Living people
New Zealand female rugby union players
New Zealand women's international rugby union players
People educated at Central Southland College